Grant Township is one of the twenty-one townships of Tama County, Iowa, United States.

History
Grant Township was organized in 1868. It is named for Ulysses S. Grant.

References

Townships in Tama County, Iowa
Townships in Iowa